James Stroud  is an American musician and record producer who works in pop, rock, R&B, soul, disco, and country music. He played with the Malaco Rhythm Section for Malaco Records. In the 1990s, he was the president of Giant Records (a subsidiary of Warner Bros. Records) and held several credits as a session drummer. He later worked for DreamWorks Records Nashville and in 2008 founded his own label, Stroudavarious Records.

Biography
Stroud began playing drums at local bar bands in Texas and Louisiana. Stroud worked with musicians such as Paul Davis in the 1960s. He and Davis also took on songwriting duties for Jackson, Mississippi-based Malaco Records. He played with and produced many acts throughout the 1960s and 1970s. While involved at Malaco, he worked with R&B artists, including Dorothy Moore, King Floyd, Frederick Knight, Jackie Moore, The Controllers, Fern Kinney, and Anita Ward.  He co-produced and played on Dorothy Moore's "Misty Blue", which was a major US and UK hit, going on to sell over four million copies.
 
He was also a session musician working with the band, Sparks which he provided guitar, drums and keyboards. He also started playing drums and synthesizer with Paul Davis, taking influences from rock and R&B artists. In the early-1980s, he began playing for Eddie Rabbitt. From there, Stroud had become a prolific session drummer in Nashville, Tennessee, backing Ronnie Milsap, K.T. Oslin and others. He was also a member of the Marshall Tucker Band. He is noted for discovering Taylor Swift.

In the late-1980s, Stroud founded The Writers' Group, a publishing company. He also took up producing, and in 1989 was named by the Academy of Country Music as Producer of the Year. When Warner Bros. Records founded the Giant Records branch, Stroud became president of the new label and produced several of its acts, including Carlene Carter, Dennis Robbins, Tracy Lawrence, Daryle Singletary, Daron Norwood and Clay Walker. At the same time, he produced acts not signed to the label. Between 1993 and 1994, twenty-one singles produced by Stroud reached the top of the country charts.

After Giant Records closed in 2000, Stroud moved to DreamWorks Records Nashville, where he worked as a producer for several artists including Darryl Worley. After the label closed down in 2005, Stroud joined Universal Music Group (DreamWorks' parent company) and served as co-CEO alongside Luke Lewis until 2007. In July 2008 he founded a new label, Stroudavarious Records, to which he signed Worley as the flagship artist.

Collaborations 
With Joe Cocker
 Civilized Man (Capitol Records, 1984)

With Dionne Warwick
 No Night So Long (Arista Records, 1980)

With Glen Campbell
 Walkin' in the Sun (Capitol Records, 1990)
 Unconditional Love (Liberty Records, 1991)

With Paul Simon
 There Goes Rhymin' Simon (Columbia Records, 1973)

With Melissa Manchester
 Melissa Manchester (Arista Records, 1979)
 For the Working Girl (Arista Records, 1980)

With Tracy Lawrence
 Sticks and Stones (Atlantic Records, 1991)
 Alibis (Atlantic Records, 1993)
 I See It Now (Atlantic Records, 1994)

With Michael Martin Murphey
 River of Time (Warner Bros. Records, 1988)

With Patrick Hernandez
 Born to Be Alive (Columbia Records, 1979)

With Tim McGraw
 Tim McGraw (Curb Records, 1993)

With Nick Kamen
 Nick Kamen (WEA, 1987)

With Eddie Rabbitt
 Horizon (Elektra Records, 1980)
 Step by Step (Elektra Records, 1981)
 Radio Romance (Warner Bros. Records, 1982)
 I Wanna Dance with You (RCA Records, 1988)

With Ronnie Milsap
 Keyed Up (RCA Records, 1983)

With Mark Collie
 Tennessee Plates (Giant, 1995)

With Anne Murray
 Heart Over Mind (Capitol Records, 1984)

With Crystal Gayle
 True Love (Elektra Records, 1982)
 Straight to the Heart (Warner Bros. Records, 1986)

With Neal McCoy
 Where Forever Begin (Atlantic Records, 1992)

With Carl Wilson
 Carl Wilson (Caribou Records, 1981)

With Toby Keith
 Shock'n Y'all (DreamWorks Records, 2003)

With Joan Baez
 Play Me Backwards (Virgin Records, 1992)

With Nigel Olsson
 Nigel Olsson (Columbia Records, 1978)
 Nigel (Bang Records, 1979)
 Changing Tides (Epic Records, 1980)

With Tanya Tucker
 Changes (Arista Records, 1982)
 Girls Like Me (Capitol Records, 1986)
 Love Me Like You Used To (Capitol Records, 1987)
 Strong Enough to Bend (Capitol Records, 1988)

With Kenny Rogers
 I Prefer the Moonlight (RCA Records, 1987)
 If Only My Heart Had a Voice (Giant, 1993)

With Nicolette Larson
 ...Say When (MCA Records, 1985)

With Dennis Robbins
 Man With a Plan (Giant, 1992)
 Born Ready (Giant, 1994)

References

Living people
Musicians from Shreveport, Louisiana
American country drummers
American country record producers
20th-century American drummers
American male drummers
Country musicians from Louisiana
20th-century American male musicians
Year of birth missing (living people)
The Marshall Tucker Band members